Independent Paralympic participants were athletes from the Federal Republic of Yugoslavia at the 1992 Summer Paralympics in Barcelona. Athletes from the parts of Yugoslavia still terming themselves "Yugoslavia" had competed as "independent Olympic participants" at the 1992 Summer Olympics, also hosted by Barcelona. They were not permitted to participate as "Yugoslavia", due to United Nations Security Council Resolution 757 placing sanctions on the country. The International Paralympic Committee thus recognises Yugoslavia's participation in the Paralympics from 1972 to 1988 and from 1996 to 2000 inclusive, but not in 1992, where its athletes officially belonged to no national delegation.

There were sixteen "independent Paralympic participants" at the 1992 Games, competing in athletics, shooting, swimming and table tennis. They won a total of eight medals, of which four gold.

Medallists

See also
Yugoslavia at the Paralympics
Independent Olympic participants at the 1992 Summer Olympics

References

Nations at the 1992 Summer Paralympics
1992
Paralympics
Independent Paralympians at the Paralympic Games